Epsilon Scorpii (ε Scorpii, abbreviated Eps Sco, ε Sco), formally named Larawag , is a star in the southern zodiac constellation of Scorpius. It has an apparent visual magnitude of +2.3, making it the fifth-brightest member of the constellation.

Epsilon Scorpii has a stellar classification of K1 III, which indicates it has exhausted the supply of hydrogen at its core and evolved into a giant star. Presently it is generating energy through the nuclear fusion of helium at its core, which, considering the star's composition, places it along an evolutionary branch termed the red clump. The star's outer atmosphere has an effective temperature of 4,560 K, giving it the orange hue of a cool K-type star.

ε Scorpii is classified as a suspected variable star, although a study of Hipparcos photometry showed a variation of no more than 0.01–0.02 magnitudes.

Nomenclature 

ε Scorpii (Latinised to Epsilon Scorpii) is the star's Bayer designation.

The star bore the traditional name Larawag in the culture of the Wardaman people of the Northern territory of Australia, meaning clear sighting. In 2016, the IAU organized a Working Group on Star Names (WGSN) to catalog and standardize proper names for stars. The WGSN approved the name Larawag for Epsilon Scorpii on 19 November 2017 and it is now so included in the List of IAU-approved Star Names.

Patrick Moore introduced the name Wei as Chinese name for this star. However, this seems to be a misreading, as Chinese  (English Tail) refers to an asterism (i.e. Chinese constellation) consisting of Epsilon Scorpii, Mu¹ Scorpii, Zeta¹ Scorpii and Zeta² Scorpii, Eta Scorpii, Theta Scorpii, Iota² Scorpii and Iota¹ Scorpii, Kappa Scorpii, Lambda Scorpii and Upsilon Scorpii.

In culture 
Epsilon Scorpii appears on the  flag of Brazil, symbolising the state of Ceará.

References

K-type giants
Horizontal-branch stars
Suspected variables
Scorpius (constellation)
Larawag
Scorpii, Epsilon
Durchmusterung objects
Scorpii, 26
Gliese and GJ objects
151680
082396
6241